Aleksandr Sergeyevich Shmonin (born 18 January 1984) is a former Russian professional football player.

Club career
He played in the Russian Football National League for FC SKA-Energiya Khabarovsk in 2002.

External links
 
 Career summary by sportbox.ru
 

1984 births
Sportspeople from Khabarovsk
Living people
Russian footballers
Association football midfielders
FC SKA-Khabarovsk players
FC Smena Komsomolsk-na-Amure players